The third series of Made in Chelsea, a British structured-reality television programme, began airing on 2 April 2012 on E4. The series concluded on 4 June 2012 after 10 episodes, however an end of season party episode aired on 11 June 2012 which was hosted by Rick Edwards and featured the cast members reuniting to discuss everything from the series. The series was confirmed on 21 November 2011 following the second series finale. This was the last series to feature original cast members Amber Atherton, Caggie Dunlop and Hugo Taylor, but also saw the introduction of new cast members Kimberley Garner, Natalie Joel and Richard Dinan. The series included a relationship blossoming between Kimberley and Richard until some interference from Cheska led to the discovery that she was living a double life. It also features a love triangle between Spencer, Jamie and Louise causing a drift between best friends, and Millie and Rosie finally rebuilding their friendship.

Cast

Episodes

{| class="wikitable plainrowheaders" style="width:100%; background:#fff;"
|- style="color:black"
! style="background:#FFCC99;"| SeriesNo.
! style="background:#FFCC99;"| EpisodeNo.
! style="background:#FFCC99;"| Title
! style="background:#FFCC99;"| Original airdate
! style="background:#FFCC99;"| Duration
! style="background:#FFCC99;"| UK viewers

|}

Ratings

External links

References

2012 British television seasons
Made in Chelsea seasons